José Eduardo Garza Escudero (born January 10, 1976), also known as Lalo Garza, is a Mexican voice actor and voice director. He is best known for the voice of Josh on Spanish dub of Drake & Josh.

Career
Born in Mexico City, he gained a B.A. in Advertising and Acting. He works in theater, television, advertising, dubbing, puppets and music.

In 1991, he began working with Audiomaster 3000, dubbing characters in TV shows, such as Brad Tylor in Home Improvement, Skeeter in Doug, Max in Mighty Max, Thorfinn in Vinland Saga, Itsy Bitsy in Itsy Bitsy Spider and Brendan in Step by Step.

In 1998 he started working for voice directions. Their most important works are the movies Flawless, The Exorcist, Drake & Josh, Laguna Beach, Veronica Mars, Naruto, Zatch Bell, Studio 60 and Growing Up Creepie.

Of the characters voiced by Garza for Mexican TV, the more notable ones are Elmo and Big Bird in Sesame Street (Plaza Sesamo), Krillin in Dragon Ball Z, Josh in Drake & Josh, Fes in That '70s show, David in Six Feet Under, Brad in Home Improvement, Skeeter in Doug, Donatello in Teenage Mutant Ninja Turtles, Prince Adam in He-Man, Bill in Sitting Ducks, Enzo in ReBoot, Henry the Green Engine in Thomas the Tank Engine & Friends, Pinocchio in Shrek 2, Shrek the third and Shrek Forever After , Weevil in Yu-Gi-Oh!, Jamie in Daria, Tom in Wheel Squad, Tommy in 3rd Rock from the Sun, Louis Stevens in Even Stevens, Jeremiah Trottman in Zoey 101, Gaara, Gamatatsu, Shukaku and Akamaru in Naruto, Parco Folgore in Zatch Bell, Francis in Malcolm in the Middle, Ichigo Kurosaki in Bleach, Carl and Carl² in Carl², Sputz Ringley in Rocket Power, Budge in Growing Up Creepie, Myron in Wayside, Xandir in Drawn Together (Spanish language title is La Casa de los Dibujos), Logan in Veronica Mars, Tom in Studio 60 and the Martians of Toy Story, Toy Story 2 and Buzz Lightyear Adventures. He also voiced Fancy-Fancy (A.K.A. Panza) in the 2011 animated feature film, Don Gato y su Pandilla.

He's also the voice director and announcer of the dubbing for iCarly.

References

External links 
 Lalo Garza Official Instagram

1976 births
Living people
Male actors from Mexico City
Mexican male voice actors
Mexican puppeteers
Mexican translators
Mexican voice directors
20th-century Mexican male actors
21st-century Mexican male actors